Zacatepec Mixtec, or Tacuate, is a Mixtec language of Oaxaca. It is spoken in the town of Santa María Zacatepec and other towns in Oaxaca, Mexico.

It has 64% intelligibility of Ixtayutla Mixtec, 63% of Pinotepa Mixtec, 40%–50% of Metlatónoc [mxv], 25%–30% of Yoloxóchitl Mixtec.

References

External links 

"This popular grammar of the Tacuate (Mixtec) language uses relatively non-technical terminology to describe the variety of Tacuate that is spoken in the town of Santa María Zacatepec, district of Putla, Oaxaca, Mexico. Topics covered include the parts of speech. The descriptions are illustrated by analyzed phrases and sentences. In addition, one chapter contains two analyzed texts. Also included is a bibliography."
OLAC resources in and about the Santa María Zacatepec Mixtec language

Mixtec language